HMS Newbury was a Racecourse-class (or Ascot-class) minesweeper of the British Royal Navy, built in 1916 by A. & J. Inglis.

The Racecourse-class  were paddle-steamers, intended for operations in shallow  coastal waters.

Newbury survived the First World War, and was sold for scrap in 1922.

Design
Following the outbreak of the First World War, the Royal Navy supplemented its very small force of minesweepers with civilian ships purchased or chartered, particularly trawlers or paddle steamers. The paddle steamers proved successful, with their shallow draft reducing the hazards from mines, and it was decided to build a class of dedicated paddle minesweepers, the Racecourse- or Ascot-class, with 24 ships ordered between September 1915 and January 1916.

Displacement was  normal. An inclined two-cylinder compound steam engine fed by cylindrical boilers drove the paddles. Armament consisted of two six-pounder (57mm) guns and two 2-pounder (40mm) anti-aircraft autocannons. The ships had a crew of 50 officers and men.

Service
Newbury was laid down at A. & J. Inglis's Pointhouse, Glasgow shipyard as Yard number 313. She was launched on 3 July 1916, and was completed on 9 September that year.

Newbury served with the Auxiliary Patrol during the war. On the night of 14/15 February 1918, Newbury was in the Dover Strait when German destroyers launched an attack on the Dover Barrage. Newbury was the first British ship attacked by the Germans, who set Newbury ablaze with their gunfire before moving on, sinking seven drifters and one trawler in total. Newbury was towed back to port by sister ship . Twelve of Newburys crew were killed.

Post-war, Newbury was employed on mine clearance duties. She was sold for scrap to the shipbreaker Ward, at their Inverkeithing works, in March 1922.

References

Bibliography

External links
https://www.worldnavalships.com/directory/shipinfo.php?ShipID=321
http://www.newburyhistory.co.uk/hms-newbury

1916 ships
World War I ships
Minesweepers of the Royal Navy